Stanisław Jan Milski (1897–1972) was a Polish actor, director, and artist manager.

He was the son of Jan Hołyst and Catherine of Rychterów. He graduated from ballet school in Poznań, but his injury after the accident prevented him from practicing as a dancer. Then he became interested in l. Czechowski decoration and theatrical costume design.

Selected filmography 
A Generation (1954) – Krone

Podhale w ogniu (1955) – Radocki

Nikodem Dyzma (1956) – Owsik

References

External links

Polish male film actors
1897 births
1972 deaths
People from Brzesko County
Recipients of the State Award Badge (Poland)